Alexandre de Moraes Gomes or simply, Alex Moraes (born March 25, 1988), is a Brazilian footballer who plays as a centre back for Negeri Sembilan in the Malaysia Super League.

Career 
Moraes began his career with Roma Esporte Apucarana and joined in November 2007 on loan to Esporte Clube Juventude, here played between June 2009 only 6 games and scores one goal, before turned back to Roma Esporte Apucarana. On 9 July 2009 Roma Esporte Apucarana's 21-year-old center-back will play on loan for Standard Liège for a season, the young Brazilian will replace U.S. international Oguchi Onyewu, who has recently signed for AC Milan.

Not too long after signed for Pahang, the club decided to dropped him and brought in Francis Forkey Doe, the experiences foreign striker in Malaysia Super League to boost the club attacking option.

On May 14, 2018, Moraes joined Negeri Sembilan club.

References

External links
 

1988 births
Living people
Brazilian footballers
Brazilian expatriate footballers
Esporte Clube Juventude players
Standard Liège players
Negeri Sembilan FA players
Expatriate footballers in Belgium
Belgian Pro League players
Association football defenders